The Council of Australian Governments (COAG) was the primary intergovernmental forum in Australia from 1992 to 2020. Comprising the federal government, the governments of the six states and two mainland territories and the Australian Local Government Association, it managed governmental relations within Australia's federal system within the scope of matters of national importance.

On 29 May 2020, Prime Minister Scott Morrison announced that COAG would be replaced by a new structure based on the National Cabinet implemented during the COVID-19 pandemic.

History 

COAG grew out of the Premiers' Conferences, which had been held for many decades. These were limited to the premiers of the six states and the Prime Minister. A related organisation is the Loan Council, which coordinates borrowing by the federal and state and territorial governments of Australia.

COAG was established in May 1992 after agreement by the then Prime Minister (Paul Keating), premiers and chief ministers, and it first met in December 1992. It was chaired by the Prime Minister. It met to debate and co-ordinate government activities between the federal and state or territorial governments and between the state and territorial governments themselves as well as issues affecting local government.

COAG differed from the United States' National Governors Association or Canada's Council of the Federation, because these bodies only include state/provincial representatives, whereas COAG also included federal and local representatives.

At a COAG meeting on 13 March 2020, it was announced that a new National Cabinet was being formed of the Prime Minister and the premiers and chief ministers of the states and territories to coordinate the response to the COVID-19 pandemic in Australia.

On 29 May 2020, Prime Minister Scott Morrison announced that COAG would be replaced by a new structure based on the National Cabinet.

Final membership

COAG and state finances 

Australia is believed to be the first federation to have introduced a formal system of horizontal fiscal equalisation (HFE) which was introduced in 1933 to compensate States which have a lower capacity to raise revenue. Many federations use fiscal equalisation to reduce the inequalities in the fiscal capacities of sub-national governments arising from the differences in their geography, demography, natural endowments and economies. However the level of equalisation sought varies. In Australia, the objective is full equalisation.

Full equalisation means that, after HFE, each of the six states, the Australian Capital Territory and the Northern Territory would have the capacity to provide services and the associated infrastructure at the same standard, if each state or territory made the same effort to raise revenue from its own sources and operated at the same level of efficiency.

Currently the funds distributed to achieve HFE are the revenues raised from the Goods and Services Tax (GST), currently about AUD50bn a year. The distribution of GST required to achieve HFE is decided by the Federal Treasurer each year, on the basis of advice provided by the Commonwealth Grants Commission (CGC).

Achieving HFE does not mean that the states and territories are directed how to raise revenue or how to spend their funds. GST revenue grants from the Commonwealth are unencumbered and available for any purpose. Accordingly, HFE equalises fiscal capacity, not fiscal policies which remain for the states and territories to decide for themselves. It does not result in the same level of services or taxes in all states and territories, direct that the states and territories must achieve any specified level of service in any area, nor impose actual budget outcomes in accordance with the Commission's calculations.

At its meeting on 13 December 2013, COAG agreed to streamline the COAG council system and refocus on COAG's priorities over the next 12 to 18 months. The reforms led to a removal of the distinction between standing and select councils.

List of councils

At its dissolution, there were twelve COAG councils:

 Federal Financial Relations Council
 Disability Reform Council
 Transport and Infrastructure Council
 Energy Council
 Skills Council
 Council of Attorneys-General
 Education Council
 Health Council
 Joint Council on Closing the Gap
 Indigenous Affairs Council
 Australian Data and Digital Council
 Women’s Safety Council

The COAG Reform Council was established in 2010 as an independent body to advise on reforms of national significance. It was disestablished in 2014.

Criticism
In 2012 a group of 20 environmental organisations released a joint communiqué denouncing the establishment of the COAG Business Advisory Forum and wanted wider representation on the Forum. The groups also opposed the weakening of environmental regulations.

After the forum's abolition in early 2020, journalist Annabel Crabb wrote that, after initial utility in the 1990s, COAG had become a "sclerotic nightmare" producing "communiques of impenetrable bureaucratese". She suggested that the meetings in Canberra had produced a performative element in which state premiers sought to boost their profile at the expense of actual reforms.

See also
National Cabinet of Australia
Joint Ministerial Committee (UK), Similar body in the United Kingdom
First Ministers' conference, Similar body in Canada
National Governors Association, Similar body in the United States of America
Federal Council of Australasia, pre-1901 equivalent
Fiscal imbalance in Australia
Inter-State Commission
MCEETYA, Ministerial Council on Education, Employment, Training and Youth Affairs
COAG Reform Council

References

External links
Council of Australian Governments

 
Government of Australia
1992 establishments in Australia
Organizations established in 1992
Organizations disestablished in 2020
Government of Australian states and territories